Hugo Tjeerd van der Velden (born 19 October 1963, in Boxmeer) is a Dutch art historian. He currently is Rijksmuseum Chair of Art History of the Middle Ages, especially in the Low Countries (a position in collaboration with Universiteit van Amsterdam).

Education and career
Hugo van der Velden studied art history at the Universiteit Utrecht, where he also taught from 1992–2003. During this time he was also a fellow at the Warburg Institute and a visiting lecturer at the Courtauld Institute. In 2003, he was appointed Professor in the History of Art and Architecture department at Harvard University. He currently teaches at the Universiteit van Amsterdam.

Works 
His first book, The Donor's Image: Gerard Loyet and the Votive Images of Charles the Bold, was published by Brepols in 2000. His forthcoming book, Van Eyck in Holland, deals with Jan van Eyck's contributions to the Turin-Milan Hours.

References

1963 births
Living people
Dutch art historians
Harvard University faculty
People from Boxmeer
Academic staff of the University of Amsterdam
Utrecht University alumni